Rudolf Emil Aigner (24 October 1903 – 11 December 1975) was an Austrian footballer. He played in 13 matches for the Austria national football team from 1924 to 1926.

References

External links 
 

1903 births
1975 deaths
Austrian footballers
Austria international footballers
Footballers from Vienna
Association football goalkeepers
1. Simmeringer SC players